Terlizzi is an Italian surname. Notable people with the surname include:

Christian Terlizzi (born 1979), Italian footballer
Rodolfo Terlizzi (1896–1971), Italian fencer

See also
Vito Di Terlizzi (born 1930), Italian long-distance runner

Italian-language surnames